Live from the El Rey Theatre is a live music CD and DVD by the band Jack's Mannequin. It was recorded on November 11 and November 12 of 2012  at the El Rey Theatre in Los Angeles, California. The November shows were advertised as the final Jack's Mannequin shows ever as Andrew McMahon decided to close the chapter on his moniker and reboot his career as a solo artist. The shows coincided with the 3rd annual benefit for the Dear Jack Foundation, McMahon's charitable organization that raises awareness for young adult cancer. All profits from the album went to benefit the foundation. 

The concert film features 14 songs taken from two nights at the El Rey Theatre, and on the DVD are woven together with interview footage of Andrew chronicling seven years of living, writing, recording and touring as Jack's Mannequin. The bonus portion of the DVD includes 9 performance-only cuts as well.

Track listing

CD/DVD/Digital audio track list
 The Mixed Tape
 Release Me
 Crashin'
 Holiday From Real
 Bruised
 Swim 
 Bloodshot 
 Amy, I
 Hammers and Strings (A Lullaby)
 Dark Blue
 The Resolution
 Restless Dream
 MFEO
 La La Lie

Bonus DVD track list
 Holiday from Real
 The Mixed Tape
 Amy, I
 Dark Blue
 Hammers and Strings (A Lullaby)
 Bruised
 The Resolution
 Restless Dream
 La La Lie

Personnel
Andrew McMahon – piano, vocals, harmonica
Bobby "Raw" Anderson – guitar, vocals
Mikey "The Kid" Wagner – bass, guitar, trumpet, vocals
Jay McMillan – drums
Jonathan Sullivan – bass, vocals
Jacques Brautbar – guitar, vocals
Matt Thiessen – guitar, vocals
Stacy Clark – vocals

2013 live albums
Jack's Mannequin albums